Mahesh Amber Kothare (Marathi pronunciation: [məɦeːʃ koʈʰaːɾe]; born 28 September 1953) is an Indian film actor, director and producer of Marathi and Hindi films. He started his acting career as child artist. Kothare acted in well-known movies such as Raja Aur Runk, Chhota Bhai, Mere Laal, and Ghar Ghar ki Kahani. The well known Hindi song Tu Kitni Achhi Hain from the film Raja Aur Runk features Kothare as Master Mahesh.

Considered a revolutionary figure in the Marathi film industry, he began his directorial career with the groundbreaking Dhum Dhadaka (1985) and has since delivered many box office hits over a period of 20 years. Kothare's films are known for their technical nuances and fantasy concepts. He is one of the few Indian film makers who have made successful films in the fantasy genre.
Kothare made the first Marathi film in true 3D, Zapatlela 2 (2013) which was the sequel to Zapatlela (1993).

In most of his hit films, he played the fictional character of inspector, Mahesh Jadhav, and his catchphrase, "Damn it!" is popular among Marathi audiences.

Career
Kothare started his career in Hindi movies with roles in Raja aur Runk and Ghar Ghar ki Kahani. He later switched to Marathi cinema, where he worked with well known stars and directors while continuing to make Hindi films without any noteworthy success. Kothare became a top Marathi director with hits including Dhumdhadaka, Zapatlela, Zapatlela 2, Khatarnak and Khabardar.

In films Gharka bhedi and Lek Chalali Sasarla, he played negative character.

Kothare, along with, Laxmikant Berde, Sachin Pilgaonkar and Ashok Saraf formed a successful quartet, giving hits after hits in the Marathi Cinema Industry in the 1980s and 1990s.

He also owns the Kothare Vision production house.

In the mid-1980s, Kothare and another young actor, Sachin Pilgaonkar, helped to revolutionize the Marathi film industry with their directing. Pilgaonkar directed Navri Mile Navryala, while Kothare directed Dhoom Dhadaka. Both films became box office hits, but Dhoom Dhadaka became a trendsetter which brought young audiences to recognize the Marathi style of movie-making. Kothare then went on to make comedies which also became major hits. He also made Dhadakebaaz, the first Marathi film shot in CinemaScope and brought a number of innovations such as Dolby Digital sound to Marathi cinema with the film Chimni Pakhara. He made Pachhadlela in 2004, which was the first Marathi film with computer-generated effects. Kothare was also the first Marathi filmmaker to produce science-fiction films. 

In the film Gupchup Gupchup and Thorali Jau he played supporting, character roles.

In the Marathi movies, he played supporting characters in films such as Devata, Jabardast, Majah Chakula, De Dandan, Khatarnak, Tharthrat, Zapatlela, Zapatlela - 2, Shubha Mangal.

In 2013, Kothare made the film Zapatlela 2 in 3D with his son Adinath Kothare in the lead. The film was the sequel to his 1993 box office hit Zapatlela, which has acquired a cult following amongst Marathi audiences and features a doll named Tatya Vinchu created by Ventriloquist and Puppeteer Ramdas Padhye and voiced by Dilip Prabhavalkar that comes to life. Kothare revived Tatya Vinchu with 3D, animatronics and state of the art CGI in the sequel Zapatlela 2, which was the first Marathi film shot in 3D using split beam technology produced by Spanish stereographer Enrique Criado. The film was shot at ND Studios, Karjat and released on 7June 2013, going on to become a big hit over its 100-day run.

Personal life
Kothare's son Adinath played a leading role in Zapatlela 2. Adinath is married to Marathi actress Urmilla Kothare. Kothare is studied B.Sc. and L.L.B., He worked as a criminal lawyer for some period.

Filmography 

As an actor, Kothare appeared primarily as a Police Inspector with his first name Mahesh.

Directorial credits

Awards and recognition

1986 – Best Director – Film Dhumdhadaka (Marathi) – Filmfare Awards
1986 – Best Film – Film Dhumdhadaka (Marathi) – Filmfare Awards
1994 – Best Director 3 – Film Mazha Chhakula (Marathi) – Maharashtra State
1994 – Best Film 3 – Film Mazha Chhakula (Marathi) – Maharashtra State
1994 – Best Director – Film Mazha Chhakula (Marathi) – Screen Award
1994 – Best Film – Film Mazha Chhakula (Marathi) – Screen Award
2001 – Best Director – Marathi Screen Award for Khatarnak (Marathi film 2000)
2007 – Best Director 2 – Film Khabardar (Marathi) Maharashtra State
2007 – Best Screenplay – Film Khabardar (Marathi) Maharashtra State
2009 – Award for Outstanding Contribution to Marathi Cinema – Maharashtra State
2021 - Filmfare Award for Excellence in Marathi Cinema

See also 
 Ashok Saraf
 Laxmikant Berde
 Sachin Pilgaonkar

References

External links 

Indian male film actors
Male actors in Hindi cinema
Male actors in Marathi cinema
Marathi film directors
Living people
Male actors from Mumbai
Film directors from Mumbai
Film producers from Mumbai
Marathi film producers
20th-century Indian film directors
21st-century Indian film directors
20th-century Indian male actors
21st-century Indian male actors
1953 births